Rosella Lau (born 17 September 1989) is a Hong Kong model and actress who has appeared in a number of television series and feature films. In 2008 she signed to the TVB as its artist after which her first performance was in the television show Boom Boom Ba. At the end of 2014, after leaving TVB, she became a freelancer.

Biography
At the age of twelve Rosella Lau with her family moved from China's Fujian Wuping to Hong Kong. She attended New Asia Middle School and then Tsung Tsin Middle School. She started as a part-time model at junior high school, then turned full-time after graduation because of her success in the television programme Boom Boom Ba which was her entry to the entertainment industry.

Filmography

Television (TVB)
 2009
 Love Kickoff as a cheerleader
 Off Pedder as an angel

 2010
 Don Juan DeMercado as a beautiful woman
 The Mysteries of Love as Rachel
 Beauty Knows No Pain as Fion
 Some Day as a pole dancer
 Show Me the Happy as Lanmei

 2011
 Dropping By Cloud Nine as Sandy
 Only You as a bride
 Relic of an Emissary as Ru Yan
 Be Home for Dinner as Abby
 My Sister of Eternal Flower as Luo Shiyun
 Super Snoops as Apple
 Til Love Do Us Lie as a female guest
 Bottled Passion as Lulu

 2012
 Wish and Switch as Ruby
 Til Love Do Us Lie as Jenny
 Let It Be Love as MiMi
 Gloves Come Off as KaKa
 House of Harmony and Vengeance as Zhen
 Come Home Love as Mei Mei (Episodes 2 and 202) and Victoria (Episode 148)
 Master of Play as a drinker
 Witness Insecurity as Lily
 Three Kingdoms RPG as a beautiful woman (Episode 1)
 Ghetto Justice II as a courtroom secretary
 King Maker as Wen Zijun
 Divas in Distress as a beautiful woman 
 Missing You as Bin's girlfriend (Episode 20)

 2013
 Friendly Fire as Ouyang Mei (Phoebe)
 Bullet Brain as a young girl (Episode 7)
 Beauty at War as Ge Jiyan
 Slow Boat Home as Ada
 Triumph in the Skies II as Liang Yidi (Edith)
 Always and Ever as Xuanmei Jiali
 The Hippocratic Crush II as Crystal

 2014
 Ruse of Engagement as a beer girl (Episode 3)
 Swipe Tap Love as Jenny
 ICAC Investigators 2014 as Sisi (Unit Three)
 Ghost Dragon of Cold Mountain as Xia Lian
 Rear Mirror as Jo Jo
 All That is Bitter is Sweet as Xiao Lu (Rose)
 Tomorrow Is Another Day as CoCo

 2015
 Raising the Bar as Lan Jingjing
 Young Charioteers as Tina Fong
 Romantic Repertoire as Lily

 2017
 Rogue Emperor as Wedebao Fei

TV programmes (TVB)
 2009
 Boom Boom Ba Ear of the singers of Sing - "Lanmei"
 Beautiful Cooking Delicious Angel - "Lanmei"

 2010
 King of Catering Awards 2010
 Big Fun Hong Kong appeared in the big prize
 Fun with Liza and Gods Episode 7

 2011
 Neighborhood Gourmet assistant
 Fu Lu Shou Da Jia Guanglin Christmas girl

Films
 2010 72 Tenants of Prosperity as VIP telephone saleswoman (Caihong)
 2011 I Love Hong Kong as Miss Dance 1987
 2011 The Fortune Buddies as Jing Mo
 2014 Don't Go Breaking My Heart 2 as (Zhang Shenan) financial girlfriend
 2016 Three as nurse

Others
 Terry Chui music videos (Ban Fenzhong, Bad Girl)
 Alex Fong - Yue Quan Shi music video

Photo albums
 Tastes of Angels
 Heart beat recording Kibby Rosella

References

External links
  

1989 births
Living people
Hong Kong film actresses
Hong Kong people of Hakka descent
Actresses from Fujian